Frederick Strachan  (born 17 August 1923) is a New Zealand retired rowing coach.

Biography
Strachan was born on 17 August 1923. Beginning in 1944, he has been a member of the North End Rowing Club (NERC) in Dunedin. He was a provincial representative rower for the Otago Rowing Association in 1948. He was involved in rowing for seven decades and 70 rowers coached by him have represented New Zealand internationally.

In 1960, Strachan coached a coxed four at NERC that was the first boat for the club to win a national championship. He was a selector for Rowing New Zealand from 1964 to 1988. In the late 1960s, Strachan promoted greater use of science in high performance sport. He was selector for the 1968 coxed four that had been intended as potential substitutes for the 1968 New Zealand eight but who ended up being nominated as a separate team and returned with gold from the 1968 Summer Olympics. He was selector of the New Zealand eight that won gold at the 1971 European Rowing Championships and gold at the 1972 Summer Olympics. He was the manager of the 1972 New Zealand Olympic rowing team. Strachan later mentored Hamish Bond, who credits Strachan with having turned him into an elite rower.

Strachan has officiated for FISA, the World Rowing Federation, at the 1964 Summer Olympics, 1968 Summer Olympics, 1970 World Rowing Championships, 1972 Summer Olympics, 1976 Summer Olympics, 1978 World Rowing Championships, and 1981 World Rowing Championships. He retired from FISA in 1988 when he hit the age barrier.

Honorary roles and awards
Strachan was president of Rowing New Zealand from 1985 to 1990, in which year he was awarded life membership. He is vice-patron of Rowing New Zealand. In the 1991 New Year Honours, he was awarded a Queen's Service Medal (QSM) for community service. At the 2005 Halberg Awards, Strachan was awarded a lifetime achievements award. In 2019, he was awarded the Sir Don Rowlands Medal by the New Zealand Rowing Association.

Notes

References

1923 births
Living people
Rowing coaches
New Zealand sports coaches
Sportspeople from Dunedin
Recipients of the Queen's Service Medal